Ashurst House may refer to:

Ashurst House (Flagstaff, Arizona), listed on the National Register of Historic Places in Coconino County, Arizona
Craig Ashurst House, Nicholasville, Kentucky, listed on the National Register of Historic Places in Jessamine County, Kentucky